Matuszak is a Polish surname, and may refer to:
 David Matuszak, author, teacher, and Westerner
 John Matuszak (1950–1989), American football defensive end and actor 
 Marv Matuszak (1931–2004), American football linebacker
  (born 1977), Coma (band) bass guitar player
 Sascha Matuszak, journalists 
 Walter Matuszak (1918–2001), American football quarterback and veterinarian

Polish-language surnames